The Silas Bent class is frequently found applied to four ships though the Naval Vessel Register and some sources officially break them into the subclasses of AGS-26 and AGS-33.  Silas Bent was the first of the first four purpose built ships for U.S. Navy surveys. Previous ships had been modifications of various naval types.

Bent (AGS-26) and Kane (AGS-27)
Two ships were built to essentially the same design at two different yards.

 USNS Silas Bent (T-AGS-26) was laid down at the American Shipbuilding Corp, Cleveland, Ohio, 2 March 1964, launched, 15 May 1964 and delivered to the Navy 23 July 1965.
  was laid down at Christy Corporation, Sturgeon Bay, Wisconsin, 19 December 1964, launched 20 November 1965 and delivered to the Navy, 19 May 1967.

Wilkes (AGS-33) and Wyman (AGS-34)

The AGS-26 and AGS-33 (Wilkes) subclass ships were externally almost identical with slightly different modernized internal configuration reflecting their being laid down (July 1968) three years after Bent's delivery to the Navy 23 July 1965 (See photos at references). The two AGS-33 ships are USNS Wilkes (T-AGS-33) and USNS Wyman (T-AGS-34)

USNS Wilkes (AGS-33) and USNS Wyman (AGS-34) were laid down on the same day, 18 July 1968, at the same shipyard, Defoe Shipbuilding Company, Bay City, Michigan.

 USNS Wilkes was launched, 31 July 1969 and delivered to the Navy, 28 June 1971.
 USNS Wyman was launched, 30 October 1969 and delivered to the Navy, 3 November 1971.

Configuration and Data Systems
The ships were designed to be capable of surveys supporting hydrographic and bathymetric charting and oceanographic requirements. They differed chiefly in installed equipment and systems, particularly data acquisition systems.

The initial Bent installation was a prototype "Shipboard Survey System" based on a standard Navy AN/UYK computer.

Later Bent was equipped with the Oceanographic Data Acquisition System (ODAS), operational 1971, as were the later oceanographic survey ships Kane and Wilkes. The Wyman replaced USNS Sgt. George D Keathley (T-AGS-35) for geophysical, particularly gravity, and bathymetric surveys.

Wyman was equipped first with the Hydrographic Data Acquisition System (HYDAS) that was replaced in the mid-1970s by a new narrow beam swath system with its own specialized data acquisition system. The swath array, replacing the single beam system, was the Bottom Topography Survey Subsystem (BOTOSS) and the processing system, replacing HYDAS, was the Bathymetric Survey System (BASS).

See also
 The Federal Ocean Program, April 1972
 Silas Bent (TAGS 26) Class
 NavSource: USNS Silas Bent (T-AGS-26) Introduction Brochure
 NavSource: USNS Wyman (T-AGS-34) with images of ship and Welcome Aboard borchure
 Silas Bent (TAGS 26) Class

References

Survey ships of the United States Navy
Oceanographic research ships of the United States Navy
Cold War auxiliary ships of the United States
Auxiliary research ship classes